This is a list of Provinces of Papua New Guinea by Human Development Index as of 2021.

References 

Papua New Guinea
Human Development Index
Papua New Guinea, Human Development Index
Provinces of Papua New Guinea